Norbi Balantén Puente (born June 24, 1972) is a retired female hammer thrower from Cuba. She set her personal best (65.28 metres) on March 16, 2001 in Victoria de Las Tunas.

Achievements

References 
 

1972 births
Living people
Cuban female hammer throwers
Athletes (track and field) at the 1995 Pan American Games
Athletes (track and field) at the 1999 Pan American Games
Pan American Games competitors for Cuba
Central American and Caribbean Games bronze medalists for Cuba
Competitors at the 1998 Central American and Caribbean Games
Central American and Caribbean Games medalists in athletics
20th-century Cuban women
20th-century Cuban people
21st-century Cuban women